Hangersley is a hamlet in the New Forest National Park of Hampshire, England. It only lies exactly 1 mile (1.5 km) from Ringwood, its nearest town.

External links

Hamlets in Hampshire
Ringwood, Hampshire